Bingley Rural is an electoral ward in the City of Bradford Metropolitan District Council. The population of the ward at the 2011 Census was 17,895.

It encompasses the villages of Harden, Wilsden, Cottingley, Cullingworth and Denholme.

Councillors 
The ward is represented on Bradford Council by three Conservative councillors, Michael Ellis, Simon Cooke and Naveed Riaz.

 indicates seat up for re-election.

References

External links 
 BCSP (Internet Explorer only)
 BBC election results
 Council ward profile (pdf)

Wards of Bradford
Bingley